Jeong Mi-kyeong (born 23 December 1965) is a South Korean basketball player. She competed in the women's tournament at the 1988 Summer Olympics.

References

1965 births
Living people
South Korean women's basketball players
Olympic basketball players of South Korea
Basketball players at the 1988 Summer Olympics
Place of birth missing (living people)
Asian Games medalists in basketball
Asian Games gold medalists for South Korea
Basketball players at the 1990 Asian Games
Medalists at the 1990 Asian Games